Yugoslavia was a country in Southeast and Central Europe for most of the 20th century. It came into existence after World War I in 1918 under the name of the Kingdom of Serbs, Croats and Slovenes by the merger of the provisional State of Slovenes, Croats and Serbs (which was formed from territories of the former Austria-Hungary) with the Kingdom of Serbia, and constituted the first union of the South Slavic people as a sovereign state, following centuries in which the region had been part of the Ottoman Empire and Austria-Hungary. Peter I of Serbia was its first sovereign. The kingdom gained international recognition on 13 July 1922 at the Conference of Ambassadors in Paris. The official name of the state was changed to Kingdom of Yugoslavia on 3 October 1929.

The Kingdom was invaded by the Axis powers on 6 April 1941. In 1943, a Democratic Federal Yugoslavia was proclaimed by the Partisan resistance. In 1944, King Peter II, then living in exile, recognised it as the legitimate government. The monarchy was subsequently abolished in November 1945. Yugoslavia was renamed the Federal People's Republic of Yugoslavia in 1945, when a communist government was established. It acquired the territories of Istria, Rijeka, and Zadar from Italy. Partisan leader Josip Broz Tito ruled the country as president until his death in 1980. In 1963, the country was renamed again, as the Socialist Federal Republic of Yugoslavia (SFRY).

The six constituent republics that made up the SFRY were the SR Bosnia and Herzegovina, SR Croatia, SR Macedonia, SR Montenegro, SR Serbia, and SR Slovenia. SR Serbia contained two Socialist Autonomous Provinces, Vojvodina and Kosovo, which after 1974 were largely equal to the other members of the federation. After an economic and political crisis in the 1980s and the rise of nationalism, Yugoslavia broke up along its republics' borders, at first into five countries, leading to the Yugoslav Wars. From 1993 to 2017, the International Criminal Tribunal for the former Yugoslavia tried political and military leaders from the former Yugoslavia for war crimes, genocide, and other crimes committed during those wars.

After the breakup, the republics of Montenegro and Serbia formed a reduced federative state, the Federal Republic of Yugoslavia (FRY), known from 2003 to 2006 as Serbia and Montenegro. This state aspired to the status of sole legal successor to the SFRY, but those claims were opposed by the other former republics. Eventually, it accepted the opinion of the Badinter Arbitration Committee about shared succession and in 2003 its official name was changed to Serbia and Montenegro. This state dissolved when Montenegro and Serbia each became independent states in 2006, with Kosovo having an ongoing dispute over its declaration of independence in 2008.

Background

The concept of Yugoslavia, as a single state for all South Slavic peoples, emerged in the late 17th century and gained prominence through the Illyrian Movement of the 19th century. The name was created by the combination of the Slavic words "jug" (south) and "slaveni" (Slavs). Moves towards the formal creation of Yugoslavia accelerated after the 1917 Corfu Declaration between the Yugoslav Committee and the government of the Kingdom of Serbia.

Kingdom of Yugoslavia

The country was formed in 1918 immediately after World War I as the Kingdom of Serbs, Croats and Slovenes by union of the State of Slovenes, Croats and Serbs and the Kingdom of Serbia. It was commonly referred to at the time as the "Versailles state". Later, the government renamed the country, leading to the first official use of Yugoslavia in 1929.

King Alexander

On 20 June 1928, Serb deputy Puniša Račić shot at five members of the opposition Croatian Peasant Party in the National Assembly, resulting in the death of two deputies on the spot and that of leader Stjepan Radić a few weeks later. On 6 January 1929, King Alexander I got rid of the constitution, banned national political parties, assumed executive power, and renamed the country Yugoslavia. He hoped to curb separatist tendencies and mitigate nationalist passions. He imposed a new constitution and relinquished his dictatorship in 1931. However, Alexander's policies later encountered opposition from other European powers stemming from developments in Italy and Germany, where Fascists and Nazis rose to power, and the Soviet Union, where Joseph Stalin became absolute ruler. None of these three regimes favored the policy pursued by Alexander I. In fact, Italy and Germany wanted to revise the international treaties signed after World War I, and the Soviets were determined to regain their positions in Europe and pursue a more active international policy.

Alexander attempted to create a centralised Yugoslavia. He decided to abolish Yugoslavia's historic regions, and new internal boundaries were drawn for provinces or banovinas. The banovinas were named after rivers. Many politicians were jailed or kept under police surveillance. During his reign, Communist ideas were banned.

The king was assassinated in Marseille during an official visit to France in 1934 by Vlado Chernozemski, an experienced marksman from Ivan Mihailov's Internal Macedonian Revolutionary Organization with the cooperation of the Ustaše, a Croatian fascist revolutionary organisation. Alexander was succeeded by his eleven-year-old son Peter II and a regency council headed by his cousin, Prince Paul.

1934–1941
The international political scene in the late 1930s was marked by growing intolerance between the principal figures, by the aggressive attitude of the totalitarian regimes and by the certainty that the order set up after World War I was losing its strongholds and its sponsors were losing their strength. Supported and pressured by Fascist Italy and Nazi Germany, Croatian leader Vladko Maček and his party managed the creation of the Banovina of Croatia (Autonomous Region with significant internal self-government) in 1939. The agreement specified that Croatia was to remain part of Yugoslavia, but it was hurriedly building an independent political identity in international relations. The entire kingdom was to be federalised but World War II stopped the fulfillment of those plans.

Prince Paul submitted to the fascist pressure and signed the Tripartite Pact in Vienna on 25 March 1941, hoping to still keep Yugoslavia out of the war. But this was at the expense of popular support for Paul's regency. Senior military officers were also opposed to the treaty and launched a coup d'état when the king returned on 27 March. Army General Dušan Simović seized power, arrested the Vienna delegation, exiled Paul, and ended the regency, giving 17-year-old King Peter full powers. Hitler then decided to attack Yugoslavia on 6 April 1941, followed immediately by an invasion of Greece where Mussolini had previously been repelled.

World War II

At 5:12 a.m. on 6 April 1941, German, Italian and Hungarian forces invaded Yugoslavia. The German Air Force (Luftwaffe) bombed Belgrade and other major Yugoslav cities. On 17 April, representatives of Yugoslavia's various regions signed an armistice with Germany in Belgrade, ending eleven days of resistance against the invading German forces. More than 300,000 Yugoslav officers and soldiers were taken prisoner.

The Axis Powers occupied Yugoslavia and split it up. The Independent State of Croatia was established as a Nazi satellite state, ruled by the fascist militia known as the Ustaše that came into existence in 1929, but was relatively limited in its activities until 1941. German troops occupied Bosnia and Herzegovina as well as part of Serbia and Slovenia, while other parts of the country were occupied by Bulgaria, Hungary, and Italy. From 1941 to 1945, the Croatian Ustaše regime persecuted and murdered around 300,000 Serbs, along with at least 30,000 Jews and Roma; hundreds of thousands of Serbs were also expelled and another 200,000-300,000 were forced to convert to Catholicism.

From the start, the Yugoslav resistance forces consisted of two factions: the communist-led Yugoslav Partisans and the royalist Chetniks, with the former receiving Allied recognition only at the Tehran conference (1943). The heavily pro-Serbian Chetniks were led by Draža Mihajlović, while the pan-Yugoslav oriented Partisans were led by Josip Broz Tito.

The Partisans initiated a guerrilla campaign that developed into the largest resistance army in occupied Western and Central Europe. The Chetniks were initially supported by the exiled royal government and the Allies, but they soon focused increasingly on combating the Partisans rather than the occupying Axis forces. By the end of the war, the Chetnik movement transformed into a collaborationist Serb nationalist militia completely dependent on Axis supplies. The Chetniks also persecuted and killed Muslims and Croats, with an estimated 50,000-68,000 victims (of which 41,000 were civilians). The highly mobile Partisans, however, carried on their guerrilla warfare with great success. Most notable of the victories against the occupying forces were the battles of Neretva and Sutjeska.

On 25 November 1942, the Anti-Fascist Council of National Liberation of Yugoslavia was convened in Bihać, modern day Bosnia and Herzegovina. The council reconvened on 29 November 1943, in Jajce, also in Bosnia and Herzegovina, and established the basis for post-war organisation of the country, establishing a federation (this date was celebrated as Republic Day after the war).

The Yugoslav Partisans were able to expel the Axis from Serbia in 1944 and the rest of Yugoslavia in 1945. The Red Army provided limited assistance with the liberation of Belgrade and withdrew after the war was over. In May 1945, the Partisans met with Allied forces outside former Yugoslav borders, after also taking over Trieste and parts of the southern Austrian provinces of Styria and Carinthia. However, the Partisans withdrew from Trieste in June of the same year under heavy pressure from Stalin, who did not want a confrontation with the other Allies.

Western attempts to reunite the Partisans, who denied the supremacy of the old government of the Kingdom of Yugoslavia, and the émigrés loyal to the king led to the Tito-Šubašić Agreement in June 1944; however, Marshal Josip Broz Tito was in control and was determined to lead an independent communist state, starting as a prime minister.  He had the support of Moscow and London and led by far the strongest Partisan force with 800,000 men.

The official Yugoslav post-war estimate of victims in Yugoslavia during World War II is 1,704,000. Subsequent data gathering in the 1980s by historians Vladimir Žerjavić and Bogoljub Kočović showed that the actual number of dead was about 1 million.

FPR Yugoslavia

On 11 November 1945, elections were held with only the Communist-led People's Front appearing on the ballot, securing all 354 seats. On 29 November, while still in exile, King Peter II was deposed by Yugoslavia's Constituent Assembly, and the Federal People's Republic of Yugoslavia was declared. However, he refused to abdicate. Marshal Tito was now in full control, and all opposition elements were eliminated.

On 31 January 1946, the new constitution of the Federal People's Republic of Yugoslavia, modelled after the constitution of the Soviet Union, established six republics, an autonomous province, and an autonomous district that were part of Serbia. The federal capital was Belgrade. The policy focused on a strong central government under the control of the Communist Party, and on recognition of the multiple nationalities. The flags of the republics used versions of the red flag or Slavic tricolor, with a red star in the centre or in the canton.

Tito's regional goal was to expand south and take control of Albania and parts of Greece. In 1947, negotiations between Yugoslavia and Bulgaria led to the Bled agreement, which proposed to form a close relationship between the two Communist countries, and enable Yugoslavia to start a civil war in Greece and use Albania and Bulgaria as bases. Stalin vetoed this agreement and it was never realised.  The break between Belgrade and Moscow was now imminent.

Yugoslavia solved the national issue of nations and nationalities (national minorities) in a way that all nations and nationalities had the same rights. However, most of the German minority of Yugoslavia, most of whom had collaborated during the occupation and had been recruited to German forces, were expelled towards Germany or Austria.

The 1948 Yugoslavia–Soviet split 

The country distanced itself from the Soviets in 1948 (cf. Cominform and Informbiro) and started to build its own way to socialism under the political leadership of Josip Broz Tito. Accordingly, the constitution was heavily amended to replace the emphasis on democratic centralism with workers' self-management and decentralization. The Communist Party was renamed to the League of Communists and adopted Titoism at its congress the previous year.

All the Communist European Countries had deferred to Stalin and rejected the Marshall Plan aid in 1947. Tito, at first went along and rejected the Marshall plan. However, in 1948 Tito broke decisively with Stalin on other issues, making Yugoslavia an independent communist state. Yugoslavia requested American aid. American leaders were internally divided, but finally agreed and began sending money on a small scale in 1949, and on a much larger scale 1950–53. The American aid was not part of the Marshall plan.

Tito criticised both Eastern Bloc and NATO nations and, together with India and other countries, started the Non-Aligned Movement in 1961, which remained the official affiliation of the country until it dissolved.

In 1974, the two provinces of Vojvodina and Kosovo-Metohija (for the latter had by then been upgraded to the status of a province) were granted greater autonomy, along with greater rights for the Albanians of Kosovo and Hungarians of Vojvodina. Both provinces were afforded much of the same status as the six republics of Yugoslavia, though they could not secede. Vojvodina and Kosovo-Metohija formed the provinces of the Republic of Serbia but also formed part of the federation, which led to the unique situation in which Central Serbia did not have its own assembly but a joint assembly with its provinces represented in it. Albanian and Hungarian became nationally recognised minority languages, and the Serbo-Croat of Bosnia and Montenegro altered to a form based on the speech of the local people and not on the standards of Zagreb and Belgrade. In Slovenia the recognized minorities were Hungarians and Italians.

SFR Yugoslavia

On 7 April 1963, the nation changed its official name to Socialist Federal Republic of Yugoslavia and Josip Broz Tito was named President for life. In the SFRY, each republic and province had its own constitution, supreme court, parliament, president and prime minister. At the top of the Yugoslav government were the President (Tito), the federal Prime Minister, and the federal Parliament (a collective Presidency was formed after Tito's death in 1980). Also important were the Communist Party general secretaries for each republic and province, and the general secretary of Central Committee of the Communist Party.

Tito was the most powerful person in the country, followed by republican and provincial premiers and presidents, and Communist Party presidents. Slobodan Penezić Krcun, Tito's chief of secret police in Serbia, fell victim to a dubious traffic incident after he started to complain about Tito's politics. Minister of the interior Aleksandar Ranković lost all of his titles and rights after a major disagreement with Tito regarding state politics. Some influential ministers in government, such as Edvard Kardelj or Stane Dolanc, were more important than the Prime Minister.

First cracks in the tightly governed system surfaced when students in Belgrade and several other cities joined the worldwide protests of 1968. President Josip Broz Tito gradually stopped the protests by giving in to some of the students' demands and saying that "students are right" during a televised speech. But in the following years, he dealt with the leaders of the protests by sacking them from university and Communist party posts.

A more severe sign of disobedience was so-called Croatian Spring of 1970 and 1971, when students in Zagreb organised demonstrations for greater civil liberties and greater Croatian autonomy, followed by mass manifestations across Croatia. The regime stifled the public protest and incarcerated the leaders, though many key Croatian representatives in the Party silently supported this cause. As a result, a new Constitution was ratified in 1974, which gave more rights to the individual republics in Yugoslavia and provinces in Serbia.

Ethnic tensions and economic crisis
After the Yugoslav Partisans took over the country at the end of WWII, nationalism was banned from being publicly promoted. Overall relative peace was retained under Tito's rule, though nationalist protests did occur, but these were usually repressed and nationalist leaders were arrested and some were executed by Yugoslav officials. However, the Croatian Spring protests in the 1970s were backed by large numbers of Croats who claimed that Yugoslavia remained a Serb hegemony and demanded that Serbia's powers be reduced.

Tito, whose home republic was Croatia, was concerned over the stability of the country and responded in a manner to appease both Croats and Serbs: he ordered the arrest of the Croat protestors, while at the same time conceding to some of their demands. In 1974, Serbia's influence in the country was significantly reduced as autonomous provinces were created in ethnic Albanian-majority populated Kosovo and the mixed-populated Vojvodina.

The fact that these autonomous provinces held the same voting power as the republics but unlike other republics could not legally separate from Yugoslavia satisfied Croatia and Slovenia, but in Serbia and in the new autonomous province of Kosovo, reaction was different. Serbs saw the new constitution as conceding to Croat and ethnic Albanian nationalists. Ethnic Albanians in Kosovo saw the creation of an autonomous province as not being enough, and demanded that Kosovo become a constituent republic with the right to separate from Yugoslavia. This created tensions within the Communist leadership, particularly among Communist Serb officials who resented the 1974 constitution as weakening Serbia's influence and jeopardising the unity of the country by allowing the republics the right to separate.

According to official statistics, from the 1950s to the early 1980s, Yugoslavia was among the fastest growing countries, approaching the ranges reported in South Korea and other miracle countries. The unique socialist system in Yugoslavia, where factories were worker cooperatives and decision-making was less centralized than in other socialist countries, may have led to the stronger growth. However, even if the absolute value of the growth rates was not as high as indicated by the official statistics, both the Soviet Union and Yugoslavia were characterized by surprisingly high growth rates of both income and education during the 1950s.

The period of European growth ended after the oil price shock in 1970s. Following that, in Yugoslavia an economic crisis erupted, and that as a product of disastrous errors by Yugoslav governments, such as borrowing vast amounts of Western capital to fund growth through exports. At the same time, Western economies went into recession, decreasing demand for Yugoslav imports, creating a large debt problem.

In 1989, according to official sources, 248 firms were declared bankrupt or were liquidated and 89,400 workers were laid off. During the first nine months of 1990 directly following the adoption of the IMF programme, another 889 enterprises with a combined work-force of 525,000 workers suffered the same fate. In other words, in less than two years "the trigger mechanism" (under the Financial Operations Act) had led to the layoff of more than 600,000 workers out of a total industrial workforce of the order of 2.7 million. An additional 20% of the work force, or half a million people, were not paid wages during the early months of 1990 as enterprises sought to avoid bankruptcy. The largest concentrations of bankrupt firms and lay-offs were in Serbia, Bosnia and Herzegovina, Macedonia and Kosovo. Real earnings were in a free fall and social programmes had collapsed; creating within the population an atmosphere of social despair and hopelessness. This was a critical turning point in the events to follow.

Breakup

After Tito's death on 4 May 1980, ethnic tensions grew in Yugoslavia. The legacy of the Constitution of 1974 was used to throw the system of decision-making into a state of paralysis, made all the more hopeless as the conflict of interests had become irreconcilable. The Albanian majority in Kosovo demanded the status of a republic in the 1981 protests in Kosovo while Serbian authorities suppressed this sentiment and proceeded to reduce the province's autonomy.

In 1986, the Serbian Academy of Sciences and Arts drafted a memorandum addressing some burning issues concerning the position of Serbs as the most numerous people in Yugoslavia. The largest Yugoslav republic in territory and population, Serbia's influence over the regions of Kosovo and Vojvodina was reduced by the 1974 Constitution. Because its two autonomous provinces had de facto prerogatives of full-fledged republics, Serbia found that its hands were tied, for the republican government was restricted in making and carrying out decisions that would apply to the provinces. Since the provinces had a vote in the Federal Presidency Council (an eight-member council composed of representatives from the six republics and the two autonomous provinces), they sometimes even entered into coalition with other republics, thus outvoting Serbia. Serbia's political impotence made it possible for others to exert pressure on the 2 million Serbs (20% of the total Serbian population) living outside Serbia.

Serbian communist leader Slobodan Milošević sought to restore pre-1974 Serbian sovereignty.  After Tito's death, Milošević made his way to becoming the next superior figure and political official for Serbia. Other republics, especially Slovenia and Croatia, denounced this move as a revival of greater Serbian hegemonism. Through a series of moves known as the "anti-bureaucratic revolution", Milošević succeeded in reducing the autonomy of Vojvodina and of Kosovo and Metohija, but both entities retained a vote in the Yugoslav Presidency Council. The very instrument that reduced Serbian influence before was now used to increase it: in the eight-member Council, Serbia could now count on four votes at a minimum: Serbia proper, then-loyal Montenegro, Vojvodina, and Kosovo.

As a result of these events, ethnic Albanian miners in Kosovo organised the 1989 Kosovo miners' strike, which dovetailed into ethnic conflict between the Albanians and the non-Albanians in the province. At around 80% of the population of Kosovo in the 1980s, ethnic-Albanians were the majority.  With Milosevic gaining control over Kosovo in 1989, the original residency changed drastically leaving only a minimum amount of Serbians left in the region. The number of Slavs in Kosovo (mainly Serbs) was quickly declining for several reasons, among them the ever-increasing ethnic tensions and subsequent emigration from the area. By 1999 the Slavs formed as little as 10% of the total population in Kosovo.

Meanwhile, Slovenia, under the presidency of Milan Kučan, and Croatia supported the Albanian miners and their struggle for formal recognition. Initial strikes turned into widespread demonstrations demanding a Kosovan republic. This angered Serbia's leadership which proceeded to use police force, and later even the Federal Army was sent to the province by the order of the Serbia-held majority in the Yugoslav Presidency Council.

In January 1990, the extraordinary 14th Congress of the League of Communists of Yugoslavia was convened. For most of the time, the Slovene and Serbian delegations were arguing over the future of the League of Communists and Yugoslavia. The Serbian delegation, led by Milošević, insisted on a policy of "one person, one vote", which would empower the plurality population, the Serbs. In turn, the Slovenes, supported by Croats, sought to reform Yugoslavia by devolving even more power to republics, but were voted down. As a result, the Slovene and Croatian delegations left the Congress and the all-Yugoslav Communist party was dissolved.

The constitutional crisis that inevitably followed resulted in a rise of nationalism in all republics: Slovenia and Croatia voiced demands for looser ties within the Federation.  Following the fall of communism in Eastern Europe, each of the republics held multi-party elections in 1990. Slovenia and Croatia held the elections in April since their communist parties chose to cede power peacefully. Other Yugoslav republics—especially Serbia—were more or less dissatisfied with the democratisation in two of the republics and proposed different sanctions (e.g. Serbian "customs tax" for Slovene products) against the two, but as the year progressed, other republics' communist parties saw the inevitability of the democratisation process; in December, as the last member of the federation, Serbia held parliamentary elections which confirmed former communists' rule in this republic.

Unresolved issues remained. In particular, Slovenia and Croatia elected governments oriented towards greater autonomy of the republics (under Milan Kučan and Franjo Tuđman, respectively), since it became clear that Serbian domination attempts and increasingly different levels of democratic standards were becoming increasingly incompatible. Serbia and Montenegro elected candidates who favoured Yugoslav unity.

The Croat quest for independence led to large Serb communities within Croatia rebelling and trying to secede from the Croat republic. Serbs in Croatia would not accept a status of a national minority in a sovereign Croatia, since they would be demoted from the status of a constituent nation of the entirety of Yugoslavia.

Yugoslav Wars

The war broke out when the new regimes tried to replace Yugoslav civilian and military forces with secessionist forces. When, in August 1990, Croatia attempted to replace police in the Serb populated Croat Krajina by force, the population first looked for refuge in the Yugoslav Army barracks, while the army remained passive. The civilians then organised armed resistance. These armed conflicts between the Croatian armed forces ("police") and civilians mark the beginning of the Yugoslav war that inflamed the region. Similarly, the attempt to replace Yugoslav frontier police by Slovene police forces provoked regional armed conflicts which finished with a minimal number of victims.

A similar attempt in Bosnia and Herzegovina led to a war that lasted more than three years (see below). The results of all these conflicts are almost complete emigration of the Serbs from all three regions, massive displacement of the populations in Bosnia and Herzegovina, and establishment of the three new independent states. The separation of Macedonia was peaceful, although the Yugoslav Army occupied the peak of the Straža mountain on the Macedonian soil.

Serbian uprisings in Croatia began in August 1990 by blocking roads leading from the Dalmatian coast towards the interior almost a year before Croatian leadership made any move towards independence. These uprisings were more or less discreetly backed up by the Serb-dominated federal army (JNA). The Serbs in Croatia proclaimed "Serb autonomous areas", later united into the Republic of Serb Krajina. The federal army tried to disarm the territorial defence forces of Slovenia (republics had their local defence forces similar to the Home Guard) in 1990 but was not completely successful. Still, Slovenia began to covertly import arms to replenish its armed forces.

Croatia also embarked upon the illegal import of arms, (following the disarmament of the republics' armed forces by the federal army) mainly from Hungary, and were under constant surveillance which produced a video of a secret meeting between the Croatian Defence minister Martin Špegelj and the two men, filmed by the Yugoslav counter-intelligence (KOS, Kontra-obavještajna služba). Špegelj announced that they were at war with the army and gave instructions about arms smuggling as well as methods of dealing with the Yugoslav Army's officers stationed in Croatian cities. Serbia and JNA used this discovery of Croatian rearmament for propaganda purposes. Guns were also fired from army bases through Croatia. Elsewhere, tensions were running high. In the same month, the Army leaders met with the Presidency of Yugoslavia in an attempt to get them to declare a state of emergency which would allow for the army to take control of the country. The army was seen as an arm of the Serbian government by that time so the consequence feared by the other republics was to be total Serbian domination of the union. The representatives of Serbia, Montenegro, Kosovo, and Vojvodina voted for the decision, while all other republics, Croatia, Slovenia, Macedonia and Bosnia and Herzegovina, voted against. The tie delayed an escalation of conflicts, but not for long.

Following the first multi-party election results, in the autumn of 1990, the republics of Slovenia and Croatia proposed transforming Yugoslavia into a loose confederation of six republics. By this proposal, republics would have right to self-determination. However Milošević rejected all such proposals, arguing that like Slovenes and Croats, the Serbs (having in mind Croatian Serbs) should also have a right to self-determination.

On 9 March 1991, demonstrations were held against Slobodan Milošević in Belgrade, but the police and the military were deployed in the streets to restore order, killing two people. In late March 1991, the Plitvice Lakes incident was one of the first sparks of open war in Croatia. The Yugoslav People's Army (JNA), whose superior officers were mainly of Serbian ethnicity, maintained an impression of being neutral, but as time went on, they got more and more involved in state politics.

On 25 June 1991, Slovenia and Croatia became the first republics to declare independence from Yugoslavia. The federal customs officers in Slovenia on the border crossings with Italy, Austria, and Hungary mainly just changed uniforms since most of them were local Slovenes. The following day (26 June), the Federal Executive Council specifically ordered the army to take control of the "internationally recognized borders", leading to the Ten-Day War. As Slovenia and Croatia fought towards independence, the Serbian and Croatian forces indulged into a violent and perilous rivalry.

The Yugoslav People's Army forces, based in barracks in Slovenia and Croatia, attempted to carry out the task within the next 48 hours. However, because of misinformation given to the Yugoslav Army conscripts that the Federation was under attack by foreign forces and the fact that the majority of them did not wish to engage in a war on the ground where they served their conscription, the Slovene territorial defence forces retook most of the posts within several days with only minimal loss of life on both sides.

There was a suspected incident of a war crime, as the Austrian ORF TV network showed footage of three Yugoslav Army soldiers surrendering to the territorial defence force, before gunfire was heard and the troops were seen falling down. None were killed in the incident yet there were numerous cases of destruction of civilian property and civilian life by the Yugoslav People's Army, including houses and a church. A civilian airport, along with a hangar and aircraft inside the hangar, was bombarded; truck drivers on the road from Ljubljana to Zagreb and Austrian journalists at the Ljubljana Airport were killed.

A ceasefire was eventually agreed upon. According to the Brioni Agreement, recognised by representatives of all republics, the international community pressured Slovenia and Croatia to place a three-month moratorium on their independence.

During these three months, the Yugoslav Army completed its pull-out from Slovenia, but in Croatia, a bloody war broke out in the autumn of 1991. Ethnic Serbs, who had created their own state Republic of Serbian Krajina in heavily Serb-populated regions resisted the police forces of the Republic of Croatia who were trying to bring that breakaway region back under Croatian jurisdiction. In some strategic places, the Yugoslav Army acted as a buffer zone; in most others it was protecting or aiding Serbs with resources and even manpower in their confrontation with the new Croatian army and their police force.

In September 1991, the Republic of Macedonia also declared independence, becoming the only former republic to gain sovereignty without resistance from the Belgrade-based Yugoslav authorities. 500 US soldiers were then deployed under the UN banner to monitor Macedonia's northern borders with the Republic of Serbia. Macedonia's first president, Kiro Gligorov, maintained good relations with Belgrade and the other breakaway republics and there have to date been no problems between Macedonian and Serbian border police even though small pockets of Kosovo and the Preševo valley complete the northern reaches of the historical region known as Macedonia (Prohor Pčinjski part), which would otherwise create a border dispute if ever Macedonian nationalism should resurface (see VMRO). This was despite the fact that the Yugoslav Army refused to abandon its military infrastructure on the top of the Straža Mountain up to the year 2000.

As a result of the conflict, the United Nations Security Council unanimously adopted UN Security Council Resolution 721 on 27 November 1991, which paved the way to the establishment of peacekeeping operations in Yugoslavia.

In Bosnia and Herzegovina in November 1991, the Bosnian Serbs held a referendum which resulted in an overwhelming vote in favour of forming a Serbian republic within the borders of Bosnia and Herzegovina and staying in a common state with Serbia and Montenegro. On 9 January 1992, the self-proclaimed Bosnian Serb assembly proclaimed a separate "Republic of the Serb people of Bosnia and Herzegovina". The referendum and creation of SARs were proclaimed unconstitutional by the government of Bosnia and Herzegovina and declared illegal and invalid. In February–March 1992, the government held a national referendum on Bosnian independence from Yugoslavia. That referendum was in turn declared contrary to the BiH and the Federal constitution by the federal Constitutional Court in Belgrade and the newly established Bosnian Serb government.

The referendum was largely boycotted by the Bosnian Serbs. The Federal court in Belgrade did not decide on the matter of the referendum of the Bosnian Serbs. The turnout was somewhere between 64 and 67% and 98% of the voters voted for independence. It was not clear what the two-thirds majority requirement actually meant and whether it was satisfied. The republic's government declared its independence on 5 April, and the Serbs immediately declared the independence of Republika Srpska. The war in Bosnia followed shortly thereafter.

Timeline
Various dates are considered the end of the Socialist Federal Republic of Yugoslavia:

 25 June 1991, when Croatia and Slovenia declared independence
 8 September 1991: following a referendum the Republic of Macedonia declared independence which was ratified by the Assembly of Macedonia on 17 September
 8 October 1991, when the 9 July moratorium on Slovene and Croatian secession ended and Croatia restated its independence in the Croatian Parliament (that day is officially considered the date of Independence)
 6 April 1992: full recognition of Bosnia and Herzegovina's independence by the European Union followed by the U.S.
 28 April 1992: the Federal Republic of Yugoslavia is formed
 14 December 1995: the Dayton Agreement is signed by the leaders of FR Yugoslavia, Bosnia and Herzegovina, and Croatia

New states

Succession, 1992–2003

As the Yugoslav Wars raged through Croatia and Bosnia, the republics of Serbia and Montenegro, which remained relatively untouched by the war, formed a rump state known as the Federal Republic of Yugoslavia (FRY) in 1992. The Federal Republic of Yugoslavia aspired to be a sole legal successor to the Socialist Federal Republic of Yugoslavia, but those claims were opposed by the other former republics. The United Nations also denied its request to automatically continue the membership of the former state. In 2000, Milošević was prosecuted for atrocities committed in his ten-year rule in Serbia and the Yugoslav Wars. Eventually, after the overthrow of Slobodan Milošević from power as president of the federation in 2000, the country dropped those aspirations, accepted the opinion of the Badinter Arbitration Committee about shared succession, and reapplied for and gained UN membership on 2 November 2000. From 1992 to 2000, some countries, including the United States, had referred to the FRY as Serbia and Montenegro as they viewed its claim to Yugoslavia's successorship as illegitimate. In April 2001, the five successor states extant at the time drafted an Agreement on Succession Issues, signing the agreement in June 2001. Marking an important transition in its history, the Federal Republic of Yugoslavia was officially renamed Serbia and Montenegro in 2003.

According to the Succession Agreement signed in Vienna on 29 June 2001, all assets of former Yugoslavia were divided between five successor states:

Succession, 2006–present
In June 2006, Montenegro became an independent nation after the results of a May 2006 referendum, therefore rendering Serbia and Montenegro no longer existent. After Montenegro's independence, Serbia became the legal successor of Serbia and Montenegro, while Montenegro re-applied for membership in international organisations. In February 2008, the Republic of Kosovo declared independence from Serbia, leading to an ongoing dispute on whether Kosovo is a legally recognised state. Republic of Kosovo is not a member of the United Nations, but a number of states, including the United States and various members of the European Union, have recognised Republic of Kosovo as a sovereign state.

Languages
Serbo-Croatian, the only language taught across former Yugoslavia, remained the second language of many Slovenes and Macedonians, especially those born during the time of Yugoslavia. After the breakup of Yugoslavia, Serbo-Croatian has lost its unitary codification and its official unitary status and has since diverged into four standardized varieties of what remains one pluricentric language: Bosnian, Croatian, Montenegrin and Serbian.

Yugo-nostalgia

Remembrance of the time of the joint state and its positive attributes is referred to as Yugo-nostalgia.
Many aspects of Yugo-nostalgia refer to the socialist system and the sense of social security it provided. There are still people from the former Yugoslavia who self-identify as Yugoslavs; this identifier is commonly seen in demographics relating to ethnicity in today's independent states.

Demographics

Yugoslavia had always been a home to a very diverse population, not only in terms of national affiliation, but also religious affiliation. Of the many religions, Islam, Roman Catholicism, Judaism, and Protestantism, as well as various Eastern Orthodox faiths, composed the religions of Yugoslavia, comprising over 40 in all. The religious demographics of Yugoslavia changed dramatically since World War II. A census taken in 1921 and later in 1948 show that 99% of the population appeared to be deeply involved with their religion and practices. With postwar government programs of modernisation and urbanisation, the percentage of religious believers took a dramatic plunge. Connections between religious belief and nationality posed a serious threat to the post-war Communist government's policies on national unity and state structure. Although Yugoslavia became a de facto atheist state, in contrast to other socialist states of the time, Catholic Church maintained an active role in society of Yugoslavia, the Holy See normalized its relations with Yugoslavia by 1967 and worked together on stopping the Vietnam War. Likewise, the Serbian Orthodox Church received favorable treatment, and Yugoslavia did not engage in anti-religious campaigns to the extent of other countries in the Eastern Bloc.

After the rise of communism, a survey taken in 1964 showed that just over 70% of the total population of Yugoslavia considered themselves to be religious believers. The places of highest religious concentration were that of Kosovo with 91% and Bosnia and Herzegovina with 83.8%. The places of lowest religious concentration were Slovenia 65.4%, Serbia with 63.7% and Croatia with 63.6%. Religious differences between Orthodox Serbs and Macedonians, Catholic Croats and Slovenes, and Muslim Bosniaks and Albanians alongside the rise of nationalism contributed to the collapse of Yugoslavia in 1991.

The Kingdom of Yugoslavia had unitary policies, suppressed autonomy and proclaimed the official ideology to be that Serbs, Croats, Bosniaks, Montenegrins, Macedonians and Slovenes were tribes of one nation of Yugoslavs (see Yugoslavism), to the heavy disagreement and resistance from Croats and other ethnic groups; this was interpreted as gradual Serbianization of Yugoslavia's non-Serb population. The ruling Communist Party of the Socialist Federal Republic of Yugoslavia was ideologically opposed to ethnic unitarism and royal hegemony, and instead promoted ethnic diversity and social Yugoslavism within the notion of "brotherhood and unity", while organizing the country as a federation.

See also
History of the Balkans

Notes and references

Notes

References

Further reading

 Allcock, John B. Explaining Yugoslavia (Columbia University Press, 2000)
 Allcock, John B. et al. eds. Conflict in the Former Yugoslavia: An Encyclopedia (1998)
 Bezdrob, Anne Marie du Preez. Sarajevo Roses: War Memoirs of a Peacekeeper. Oshun, 2002. 
 
Chan, Adrian. Free to Choose: A Teacher's Resource and Activity Guide to Revolution and Reform in Eastern Europe. Stanford, CA: SPICE, 1991. ED 351 248
Cigar, Norman. Genocide in Bosnia: The Policy of Ethnic-Cleansing. College Station: Texas A&M University Press, 1995
Cohen, Lenard J. Broken Bonds: The Disintegration of Yugoslavia. Boulder, CO: Westview Press, 1993
Conversi, Daniele: German -Bashing and the Breakup of Yugoslavia, The Donald W. Treadgold Papers in Russian, East European and Central Asian Studies, no. 16, March 1998 (University of Washington: HMJ School of International Studies)
Djilas, Milovan. Land without Justice, [with] introd. and notes by William Jovanovich. New York: Harcourt, Brace and Co., 1958. 
Dragnich, Alex N. Serbs and Croats. The Struggle in Yugoslavia. New York: Harcourt Brace Jovanovich, 1992
Fisher, Sharon. Political Change in Post-Communist Slovakia and Croatia: From Nationalist to Europeanist. New York: Palgrave Macmillan, 2006 
Glenny, Mischa. The Balkans: Nationalism, War and the Great Powers, 1804–1999 (London: Penguin Books Ltd, 2000)
Glenny, Mischa. The fall of Yugoslavia: The Third Balkan War, 
Gutman, Roy. A Witness to Genocide. The 1993 Pulitzer Prize-winning Dispatches on the "Ethnic Cleansing" of Bosnia. New York: Macmillan, 1993
 Hall, Richard C., ed. War in the Balkans: An Encyclopedic History from the Fall of the Ottoman Empire to the Breakup of Yugoslavia (2014) excerpt
Hall, Brian. The Impossible Country: A Journey Through the Last Days of Yugoslavia (Penguin Books. New York, 1994)
Hayden, Robert M.: Blueprints for a House Divided: The Constitutional Logic of the Yugoslav Conflicts. Ann Arbor: University of Michigan Press, 2000
Hoare, Marko A., A History of Bosnia: From the Middle Ages to the Present Day. London: Saqi, 2007
 Hornyak, Arpad. Hungarian-Yugoslav Diplomatic Relations, 1918–1927 (East European Monographs, distributed by Columbia University Press; 2013) 426 pages
Jelavich, Barbara: History of the Balkans: Eighteenth and Nineteenth Centuries, Volume 1. New York: American Council of Learned Societies, 1983 ED 236 093
Jelavich, Barbara: History of the Balkans: Twentieth Century, Volume 2. New York: American Council of Learned Societies, 1983. ED 236 094
Kohlmann, Evan F.: Al-Qaida's Jihad in Europe: The Afghan-Bosnian Network Berg, New York 2004, ; 
Lampe, John R: Yugoslavia As History: Twice There Was a Country Great Britain, Cambridge, 1996, 
Malesevic, Sinisa: Ideology, Legitimacy and the New State: Yugoslavia, Serbia and Croatia. London: Routledge, 2002.
Owen, David. Balkan Odyssey Harcourt (Harvest Book), 1997
 Pavlowitch, Stevan K. The improbable survivor: Yugoslavia and its problems, 1918–1988 (1988).  online free to borrow
 Pavlowitch, Stevan K. Tito—Yugoslavia's great dictator : a reassessment (1992)  online free to borrow
 Pavlowitch, Steven. Hitler's New Disorder: The Second World War in Yugoslavia (2008)  excerpt and text search
 
 Roberts, Walter R.: Tito, Mihailovic, and the Allies: 1941–1945. Duke University Press, 1987; .
 Sacco, Joe: Safe Area Gorazde: The War in Eastern Bosnia 1992–1995. Fantagraphics Books, January 2002
 Silber, Laura and Allan Little:Yugoslavia: Death of a Nation. New York: Penguin Books, 1997
 "New Power" at Time magazine (reprinted from 4 December 1944)
 West, Rebecca: Black Lamb and Gray Falcon: A Journey Through Yugoslavia. Viking, 1941

Historiography
 Perović, Jeronim.  "The Tito-Stalin split: a reassessment in light of new evidence." Journal of Cold War Studies 9.2 (2007): 32–63. online

External links

 
 Maps
 
 The First Yugoslavia: Search for a Viable Political System, by Alex N. Dragnich
 European University Institute Yugoslavia
 "Yugoslavia: the outworn structure"—CIA report from November 1970
 Timeline: Break-up of Yugoslavia at BBC News
 Teaching about Conflict and Crisis in the Former Yugoslavia
 Video on the Conflict in the Former Yugoslavia from the Dean Peter Krogh Foreign Affairs Digital Archives
 The collapse of communist Yugoslavia

 
Former countries in the Balkans
Former monarchies
States and territories established in 1918
States and territories disestablished in 1992
Former countries